The Sussex Wildlife Trust (SWT) is a conservation charity which aims to protect natural life in Sussex. It was founded in 1961 and is one of 46 wildlife trusts across the UK and the Isle of Man and Alderney. , it has 33,000 members and manages  of land for nature. It is a registered charity and in the year to 31 March 2019 it had an income of £5.7 million and expenditure of £4 million, resulting in net income of £1.7 million.

The SWT manages twenty-six nature reserves in the county. Nineteen are Sites of Special Scientific Interest, one is a national nature reserve, eleven are local nature reserves, eight are Special Areas of Conservation, three are Special Protection Areas, three are Ramsar sites and seven are Nature Conservation Review sites. Its headquarters at Woods Mill, south of Henfield, is also a nature reserve with a lake, woodland and meadows.

The historic county of Sussex is divided into the administrative counties of East Sussex and West Sussex. The South Downs stretches across the county from west to east. This area is chalk and to the north is the Weald, which is composed of heavy clays and sand. The coast has a succession of holiday towns such as Brighton, Eastbourne, Bognor Regis and Worthing.

Key

Public access
FP = public access to footpaths through the site
NO = No public access to the site
PP = public access to part of the site
YES = public access to the whole or most of the site

Designations
LNR = Local nature reserve
NCR = Nature Conservation Review
NNR = National nature reserve
Ramsar = Ramsar site, an internationally important wetland site
SAC = Special Area of Conservation
SPA = Special Protection Area under the European Union Directive on the Conservation of Wild Birds
SSSI = Site of Special Scientific Interest

Sites

See also
List of Local Nature Reserves in East Sussex
List of Local Nature Reserves in West Sussex
List of Sites of Special Scientific Interest in East Sussex
List of Sites of Special Scientific Interest in West Sussex

Notes

References

Sources

External links
Sussex Wildlife Trust website

 
Environment of Sussex
Wildlife Trusts of England
Organizations established in 1961
1961 establishments in England